Early parliamentary elections were held in the Comoros on 12 December 1993, with a second round in all but four seats on 20 December. The elections were held after President Said Mohamed Djohar dissolved the Federal Assembly elected in November 1992.

The result was a victory for the Djohar's Rally for Democracy and Renewal party, which won 28 of the 42 seats.

Results

References

Comoros
Elections in the Comoros
Legislative
Election and referendum articles with incomplete results
Comoros